T. cuspidata may refer to:
 Taxus cuspidata, the Japanese yew or spreading yew, a tree species native to Japan, Korea, northeast China and the extreme southeast of Russia
 Trypeta cuspidata, a fruit fly species

See also
 Cuspidata (disambiguation)